Nikolayevka is a rural locality in Maritsky Selsoviet Rural Settlement, Lgovsky District, Kursk Oblast, Russia. Population:

Geography 
The village is located on the Prutishche River in the basin of the Seym, 61 km from the Russia–Ukraine border, 63 km north-west of Kursk, 12.5 km north-east of the district center – the town Lgov, 2 km from the selsoviet center – Maritsa.

 Climate
Nikolayevka has a warm-summer humid continental climate (Dfb in the Köppen climate classification).

Transport 
Nikolayevka is located 15 km from the road of regional importance  (Kursk – Lgov – Rylsk – border with Ukraine) as part of the European route E38, 2 km from the road  (Lgov – Konyshyovka), 19 km from the road of intermunicipal significance  (38K-017 – Nikolayevka – Shirkovo), 2 km from the road  (38K-023 – Olshanka – Marmyzhi – 38N-362), on the road  (38N-437 – Krasnaya Dubrava), 1.5 km from the nearest railway halt Maritsa (railway line Navlya – Lgov-Kiyevsky).

The rural locality is situated 69 km from Kursk Vostochny Airport, 153 km from Belgorod International Airport and 272 km from Voronezh Peter the Great Airport.

References

Notes

Sources

Rural localities in Lgovsky District